Pantaleon, also known as Panteleimon, was a Greek king who reigned some time between 190–180 BC  in Bactria and India. He was a younger contemporary or successor of the Greco-Bactrian king Demetrius, and is sometimes believed to have been his brother and/or subking. 

The scarcity of his coinage indicates a short reign. Known evidence suggests that he was replaced by his (probable) brother or son Agathocles, by whom he was commemorated on a "pedigree" coin.

Copper-Nickel coinage
Some of his coins (as well as those of Agathocles and Euthydemus II) have another surprising characteristic: they are made of copper-nickel alloy, a technology that would not be developed in the West until the 18th century, but was known by the Chinese at the time. This suggests that exchanges of the metallic alloy or technicians happened between China and the region of Bactria.

Bilingual Indian-standard coinage
He was the first Greek king to strike Indian coins, peculiar irregular bronzes representing a lion with a dancing Indian woman, probably the goddess Lakshmi (a type also known in the Post-Mauryan coinage of Gandhara), which suggests he had his base in Arachosia and Gandhara and wanted support from the native population.

External links 
 Coins of Pantaleon
Catalogue of coins of Pantaleon

Indo-Greek kings
History of Pakistan
2nd-century BC rulers in Asia
Year of birth unknown
180 BC deaths
Euthydemid dynasty